is a side-scrolling shooter published by Irem, and similar in style to their earlier R-Type. In 1998, the game was released with Image Fight as a one-disc doublebill on PlayStation and Sega Saturn. In 2019, the game was released on the PlayStation 4 and Nintendo Switch as part of Hamster Corporation's Arcade Archives series, marking its first official release outside Japan.

Gameplay
The game itself is a side-scroller like R-Type, albeit with a short vertical-scrolling area towards the end of the sixth level. Instead of the Force pod, however, the main power-up apparatus takes the form of two flexible tentacles. The tentacles are invulnerable to all enemy attacks, and can be positioned with careful maneuvering of the X-002. Konami's Xexex is based on a fusion of this weaponry with the Force system of R-Type. In the PlayStation 2 game R-Type Final, the ship "RX-12 Cross The Rubicon" uses the "Flexible Force", a Force based on XMultiply with roughly the same attacks.

Plot
The game centers around an unusual alien invasion against a colony planet in the year 2249—the aliens themselves are microscopic creatures that invade, infect, and kill the colonists. Scientists have deployed the microscopic fighter X-002 into the body of a person who has been invaded by the alien queen.

Reception 
In Japan, Game Machine listed X Multiply on their November 1, 1989 issue as being the eighth most-successful table arcade game of the year.

Notes

References

External links

X Multiply at Arcade Archives Page

1989 video games
Arcade video games
Irem games
Multiplayer and single-player video games
Nintendo Switch games
PlayStation 4 games
PlayStation (console) games
Science fiction video games
Horizontally scrolling shooters
Sega Saturn games
Video games about microbes
Video games about size change
Video games developed in Japan
Video games set in the 23rd century